Dolsando or Dolsan Island is tenth-largest island in South Korea and largest island in Yeosu city. It is the principal island of Dolsan town, on the southeastern coast of South Jeolla province, South Korea.

See also 
 Islands of South Korea
 Geography of South Korea

Islands of South Jeolla Province
Yeosu